Eastern Bontok (Eastern Bontoc) is a language of the Bontok group spoken in the Philippines. The 2007 census claimed there were around  speakers.

Distribution 
According to Ethnologue, Eastern Bontok is spoken in the following areas: Cordillera Administrative Region: East mountain province: Barlig Municipality: Barlig, Kadaklan, and Lias villages.

Dialects 
Ethnologue reports 3 dialects for Eastern Bontok: Finallig, Kinajakran (Kenachakran) and Liniyas.

Similarities 
The language was reported to be similar with 4 other Bontok languages: Northern Bontok, Southwestern Bontok and Southern Bontok.

See also 
 Cordillera Administrative Region
 Bontoc language
 Bontoc people

References 

Languages of Mountain Province
South–Central Cordilleran languages